Danvers is an unincorporated community in Fergus County, in the U.S. state of Montana.

Nearby St. Wenceslaus Catholic Church is on the NRHP.

Demographics

History
A post office was established at Danvers in 1914, and remained in operation until it was discontinued in 1982. The community took its name after Danvers, Massachusetts.

References

Unincorporated communities in Fergus County, Montana
Unincorporated communities in Montana